Cockleroi or Cockleroy is a prominent hill in Scotland. It is Linlithgow's local hill.
On its top there are some remains of an Iron Age's hill fort.

Etymology
There are multiple explanations for the name Cockleroi. The most phonetically plausible is derivation from Gaelic *cochull-ruadh meaning "red cap, hood or mantle". Less convincing Gaelic derivations are *cachaileth ruadh, "red gate", *cuchailte ruadh, "red residence, seat". The name may be Brittonic and derived from *cloc-erjo- (from *clog, "rock, crag, steep cliff", Welsh clegyr), suffixed with rūδ, "red" (Welsh rhudd), but this requires double metathesis and unexplained reversion of -e- to –o-.

References

Mountains and hills of West Lothian